Simon Rea (born 20 September 1976) is an English former professional footballer who played as a defender in the Football League with Birmingham City, Peterborough United and Cambridge United. He also played for non-league clubs Kettering Town, Nuneaton Borough, Redditch United, Kidderminster Harriers, Corby Town and Leamington.

Rea made 159 league appearances and played in another 22 national cup matches for Peterborough between 1999 and 2005.

References

External links

1976 births
Living people
People from Kenilworth
English footballers
Association football defenders
Birmingham City F.C. players
Kettering Town F.C. players
Peterborough United F.C. players
Cambridge United F.C. players
Nuneaton Borough F.C. players
Redditch United F.C. players
Kidderminster Harriers F.C. players
Corby Town F.C. players
Leamington F.C. players
English Football League players